Chyorny Mys is the name of several rural localities in Russia:
Chyorny Mys, Khabarovsk Krai, a selo in Komsomolsky District of Khabarovsk Krai
Chyorny Mys, Kolyvansky District, Novosibirsk Oblast, a village in Kolyvansky District of Novosibirsk Oblast
Chyorny Mys, Ubinsky District, Novosibirsk Oblast, a selo in Ubinsky District of Novosibirsk Oblast

See also 
 Mys-Chyorny, a rural  locality in Murmansk Oblast